Joseph Severn (7 December 1793  – 3 August 1879) was an English portrait and subject painter and a personal friend of the famous English poet John Keats. He exhibited portraits, Italian genre, literary and biblical subjects, and a selection of his paintings can today be found in some of the most important museums in London, including the National Portrait Gallery, the Victoria and Albert Museum and Tate Britain.

Background 

The eldest son of a music teacher, Severn was born at Hoxton, near London, and apprenticed at the age of 14 to William Bond, an engraver. Severn was one of seven children; two of his brothers, Thomas (1801–1881) and Charles (1806–1894), became professional musicians, and Severn himself was an adroit pianist. During his early years he practised portraiture as a miniaturist.

Early years in London 1815-1820

In 1815, he was admitted to the Royal Academy Schools in London and exhibited his first work in oil, Hermia and Helena, a subject from A Midsummer Night's Dream, along with a portrait miniature, "J. Keats, Esq", in the Royal Academy Exhibition of 1819. He probably first met the poet John Keats in the spring of 1816.

In 1819, Severn was awarded the gold medal of the Royal Academy for his painting Una and the Red Cross Knight in the Cave of Despair which was inspired by the epic poem The Faerie Queene by Edmund Spenser. It was the first time the prize had been awarded in eight years and the painting was exhibited at the Academy in 1820. This award also allowed Severn to apply for a three years' traveling studentship, paid for by the Royal Academy. The painting was purchased by Lord Houghton, the first biographer of Keats; although it was recorded sold by Christie's in June 1963, it has since disappeared from public view and there are no reproductions of it in the public domain.

According to a new edition of Severn's letters and memoirs, Severn fathered an illegitimate child named Henry (b. 31 Aug 1819) about a year before leaving England for Italy. In 1826 there were plans for father and son to reunite, but Henry died, aged 11, before he could make the journey to Rome.

Journey to Italy with John Keats, 1820–1821
 On 17 September 1820, Severn set sail onboard the Maria Crowther from England to Italy with the famous English poet John Keats. Keats and Severn had known one another in England, but they were only passing acquaintances. Yet it was Severn who agreed to accompany the poet to Rome when all others could, or would, not. The trip was intended to cure Keats's lingering illness, which he suspected was tuberculosis; however, his friends and several doctors disagreed and urged him to spend some time in a warm climate. After a harrowing voyage, they arrived in the Bay of Naples on 21 October, only to be placed in quarantine for ten days. The two men remained in Naples for a week before heading off to Rome in a small carriage, where they arrived mid-November 1820 and met Keats's physician, Dr. James Clark.  In Rome they lived in an apartment at number 26 Piazza di Spagna, just at the bottom right of the Spanish Steps and overlooking Bernini's famous Barcaccia fountain.

Severn had left England against his father's wishes and with little money. In fact, his father was so incensed by his departure that, as Severn reported in a late memoir, "in his insane rage he struck me a blow which fell me to the ground." He was never to see his father again. While in Rome during the winter of 1820-21, Severn wrote numerous letters about Keats to their mutual friends in England, in particular William Haslam and Charles Armitage Brown, who then shared them with other members of the Keats circle, including the poet's fiancée, Fanny Brawne. These journal-letters now represent the only surviving account of the poet's final months and as a consequence are used as the primary historical source for biographers of Keats's last days.

Severn nursed Keats until his death on 23 February 1821, three months after they had arrived in Rome. As he reported to John Taylor two weeks afterwards, "Each day he would look up in the doctors face to discover how long he should live -- he would say -- "how long will this posthumous life of mine last"—that look was more than we could ever bear—the extreme brightness of his eyes—with his poor pallid face—were not earthly --" Severn's ordeal was recognized by Keats himself, who, a month before his death, said, "Severn I can see under your quiet look -- immense twisting and contending -- you dont know what you are reading -- you are induring  for me more than I'd have you -- O! that my last hour was come --" He was later thanked for his devotion by the poet Percy B. Shelley in the preface to his elegy, Adonais, which was written for Keats in 1821. It was also at this time that Severn met, among other notables, the sculptors John Gibson and Antonio Canova, and Lord Byron's friend, the adventurer Edward John Trelawny. Severn made a sketch of Trelawny in 1838.

Life and work after the death of Keats 

Until recently, it was believed that Severn's life culminated in his association with Keats and that he lived on this fame for the rest of his long life. In reality, Severn launched his own successful artistic career soon after Keats died, becoming a versatile painter in Rome during the 1820s and 1830s. He painted miniatures and altarpieces, landscapes and frescoes, historical and religious scenes, and subjects from the Bible, Greek mythology and Shakespeare. His pictures of Italian peasant life and pastoral genre scenes became very popular with British visitors on the continent and generated multiple commissions for his work.

Severn was also instrumental in helping to found the British Academy of the Fine Arts in Rome, which drew the support of such influential figures as the Duke of Devonshire, John Flaxman and Sir Thomas Lawrence. Severn's spacious apartment in the Via di San Isidoro became the busy center of Academy life. Among those who joined the academy were Charles Eastlake, Richard Westmacott (the younger), William Bewick and Thomas Uwins. Perhaps the most dedicated patron of Severn's work in the 1830s was William Gladstone, who was drawn to Severn more for his reputation as a painter than as Keats's friend.

On his return to England in 1841 Severn fell on hard times, trying desperately to earn enough money to support his growing family by painting portraits. Although he was never able to match his early artistic success in Rome and eventually had to flee his creditors for the Isle of Jersey in 1853, between 1819 and 1857, Severn exhibited 53 paintings at the Royal Academy in London.

In 1861, Severn was appointed British Consul in Rome during the ferment over Italian unification. A few months before his arrival Garibaldi had seized the Kingdom of Naples, and all of Southern Italy and Sicily had been annexed to the new Kingdom of Italy. Many of the kingdoms, principalities and dukedoms in the Italian peninsula had come together under the leadership of Victor Emmanuel II, but Rome and its surroundings remained as the rump of the Papal States. This was the case throughout the majority of Severn's tenure as Consul, as Pope Pius IX managed to retain a fragile hold on power, relying on a garrison of French troops to control Rome. Although the official position of the British government on "The Roman Question" was neutrality and nonintervention, Severn often took diplomatic action that his superiors viewed as exceeding his mandate as Consul. On several occasions, such as when he used his office to liberate Italian political prisoners in 1864, he was rebuked by the Foreign Office. His knowledge of the Italian language and his affability and good humour, however, often helped in mediating between the papal regime and the British government.  He welcomed British visitors to Rome, such as Elizabeth Barrett and Robert Browning, telling them about the time he nursed Keats, and he was able on many occasions to offer advice and protection for British visitors who found themselves in awkward scrapes. He eventually retired as Consul in 1872.

Marriage and family 

In 1828 Severn married Elizabeth Montgomerie, the natural (i.e. illegitimate) daughter of Archibald, Lord Montgomerie (1773–1814) and the ward of Lady Westmoreland, one of the artist's patrons in Rome. Together they had seven children, three of whom became noteworthy artists: Walter and Arthur Severn, and Ann Mary Newton, who married the archeologist and Keeper of Antiquities at the British Museum, Charles Thomas Newton. Mary had a successful painting career in England, supporting the family for a time and executing a number of portraits of the Royal Family. Her early death from measles at the age of 32 affected Severn. In 1871, Arthur Severn married Joan Ruskin Agnew, a cousin of the Victorian art and social critic John Ruskin. The Severns had another child, Arthur, who died as an infant in a crib accident. He is buried between Keats and Severn in the Protestant Cemetery in Rome.

Death 

Severn died on 3 August 1879 at the age of 85, and was buried in the Protestant Cemetery alongside John Keats. Both gravestones are still standing today.  Shelley and Trelawny are also buried side by side in the same cemetery.

Paintings 

Severn is best known for his many portraits of Keats, the most famous being the miniature portrait in The Fitzwilliam Museum (1819), the pen-and-ink sketch, Keats on his Deathbed (1821), in the Keats-Shelley house, Rome, and the oil painting of the poet reading, John Keats at Wentworth Place (1821–23), in the National Portrait Gallery. A later painting, Keats, at Hampstead, when he first imagined his Ode to a Nightingale (1849), now at Keats House, is also notable. In the 1860s Severn produced a number of copies and memory portraits as Keats's reputation continued to grow. The most influential of Severn's early Italian genre paintings are The Vintage, commissioned by the Duke of Bedford in 1825, and The Fountain (Royal Palace, Brussels) commissioned by Leopold I of Belgium in 1826. The latter picture likely influenced J. M. W. Turner's major work, The View of Orvieto. One of his most remarkably inventive works is the Rime of the Ancient Mariner (1839) based on Samuel Coleridge's famous poem, which recently sold at Sotheby's for £32,400. Another historical subject, The Abdication of Mary, Queen of Scots, sold for £115,250 at Sotheby's Gleneagles sale on 26 August 2008.

Severn also painted such works as Cordelia Watching by the Bed of Lear, Shepherds in the Campagna, Shelley Composing Prometheus Unbound, Isabella and the Pot of Basil, Portia with the Casket, Ariel, Rienzi, The Infant of the Apocalypse Saved from the Dragon, a large altarpiece for the church of San Paolo fuori le Mura at Rome, and many portraits of statesman and aristocrats, including Baron Bunsen and William Gladstone. The last picture he exhibited at the Royal Academy was a scene from Oliver Goldsmith's The Deserted Village in 1857.

Links to images and descriptions of Severn's drawings and paintings
A slideshow of paintings by Severn on the Art UK website
Portraits by Severn at the National Portrait Gallery, London
The Infant of the Apocalypse Saved from the Dragon at Tate Britain, London
Ariel at the Victoria and Albert Museum, London
Ariel: 'Where the Bee Sucks... at the Victoria and Albert Museum, London
Keats on his Deathbed at the Keats-Shelley house, Rome
Severn's original miniature of Keats, painted in 1819 at The Fitzwilliam Museum, Cambridge
Supposed portrait of Keats, attributed to Severn at The New Art Gallery, Walsall
Portrait of John Crossley of Scaitcliffe at the Christchurch Art Gallery, Christchurch, New Zealand 
Ariel riding on a Bat at the Ashmolean Museum, Oxford
Sketches by Severn at Wake Forest University, North Carolina

Results of Severn's paintings sold at public auction
 Portrait of John Keats sold at Bonhams auction house in October 2005 for £21,600
 A lady painting in her album sold at Bonhams auction house in November 2006 for £7,767
 Ophelia auctioned at Sotheby's auction house in November 2011
 Odalisque sold at Sotheby's auction house in November 2006 for £14,400 
 Rime of the Ancient Mariner sold at Sotheby's auction house in October 2006 for £32,400 
 Italian peasants on the Campagna sold at Sotheby's auction house in October 2006 for £12,000 
 The Abdication of Mary, Queen of Scots sold at Sotheby's auction house in August 2008 for £115,250

Biographies and books 

In 1892 the first significant collection of Severn's papers was published by William Sharp in The Life and Letters of Joseph Severn. Modern critics have cast doubt on the accuracy of Sharp's transcriptions and noted important omissions and embellishments.

In 1965, Sheila Birkenhead published Illustrious Friends: The story of Joseph Severn and his son Arthur.

In 2005, Grant F. Scott published Joseph Severn: Letters and Memoirs in which he re-edited the original material, added hundreds of newly discovered letters, included numerous reproductions of Severn's paintings, and prefaced this material with a critical introduction and commentary.

In 2009, Sue Brown published the biography Joseph Severn, A Life: The Rewards of Friendship using Scott's new information to provide a reassessment of Severn's character, his friendship with Keats, and his own subsequent artistic and diplomatic career.

Notes

References 
William Sharp, The Life and Letters of Joseph Severn (London: Sampson Low, Marston, 1892)
Sheila Birkenhead, Against Oblivion: The Life of Joseph Severn (London: Cassell, 1943)
Noel Blakiston, The Roman Question: Extracts from the Despatches of Odo Russell from Rome 1858-1870 (London: Chapman Hall, 1962)
Cecelia Powell, Turner in the South: Rome, Naples, Florence (New Haven and London: Yale UP, 1987)
Grant F. Scott, ed. Joseph Severn: Letters and Memoirs (Aldershot, UK: Ashgate, 2005)
Grant F. Scott and Sue Brown, ed. New Letters from Charles Brown to Joseph Severn (College Park, Maryland: Romantic Circles, 2007; revised 2010) <http://www.rc.umd.edu/editions/brownsevern/>
Grant F. Scott, "New Severn Letters and Paintings: An Update with Corrections," Keats-Shelley Journal 58 (2009): 114-138.
Sue Brown, Joseph Severn, A Life: The Rewards of Friendship (London: Oxford UP, 2009)

Further reading 
Hyder E. Rollins, ed. The Keats Circle: Letters and Papers 1816-1878 (Cambridge, MA.: Harvard UP, 1948; rev. ed. 1965)
Cecil Roberts, The Remarkable Young Man (London: Hodder & Stoughton, 1954)
Sheila Birkenhead, Illustrious Friends: The Story of Joseph Severn and His Son Arthur (London: Hamish Hamilton, 1965)
Noel Blakiston, "Joseph Severn, Consul in Rome, 1861-1871," History Today 18 (May 1968): 326-336.
Sue Brown, "Fresh Light on the Friendship of Charles Brown and Joseph Severn," Keats-Shelley Review 18 (2004): 138-148.
Sue Brown, "The Friend of Keats: The Reinvention of Joseph Severn," in Eugene Stelzig, ed., Romantic Autobiography (Aldershot, UK: Ashgate, 2009)
Grant F. Scott, "After Keats: The Return of Joseph Severn to England in 1838," Romanticism on the Net 40 (November 2005). <http://www.erudit.org/revue/ron/2005/v/n40/012458ar.html>
Grant F. Scott, "Sacred Relics: A Discovery of New Severn Letters," European Romantic Review 16:3 (2005): 283-295.

External links 

Website of the Keats Shelley house museum in Rome, Italy where Severn lived 1820-1821
Website of the Non Catholic cemetery in Rome, Italy where both Severn and Keats graves still stand today
Transcripts of some of Severn's letters about Keats
Detailed history about Severn and Keats in the years 1819-1821
Guardian newspaper article on Grant F. Scott's new book about Severn
"'Once More the Poet': Keats, Severn and the Grecian Lyre". Article by John Curtis Franklin about Severn's role in the design of Keats's tombstone, Protestant Cemetery, Rome
 
Joseph Severn in the Keats Collection at the Houghton Library, Harvard University
Joseph Severn at the National Archives, London

1793 births
1879 deaths
19th-century English painters
English male painters
English portrait painters
Painters from London
Burials in the Protestant Cemetery, Rome
19th-century English male artists